Magali Le Floc'h (born 17 August 1975) is a former French racing cyclist. She won the French national road race title in 2002 and 2005. She also competed in the women's road race at the 2000 Summer Olympics.

References

External links
 

1975 births
Living people
French female cyclists
People from Meaux
Cyclists at the 2000 Summer Olympics
Olympic cyclists of France
Sportspeople from Seine-et-Marne
Cyclists from Île-de-France